Everything is the debut studio album by American singer Joe. It was released by Polygram Records on August 17, 1993, in the United States. Produced by Joe along with Keith Mille, J. Dibbs, and Dave "Jam" Hall, it peaked at number 105 on the US Billboard 200 and number 16 on Billboards Top R&B/Hip-Hop Albums. Everything spawned three singles, including "I'm in Luv" and "The One for Me".

Track listing

Notes
 signifies a co-producer

Charts

References

External links
[ Everything] at Allmusic

1993 debut albums
Joe (singer) albums